Acontia is a genus of moths of the family Noctuidae. The genus was named by Ferdinand Ochsenheimer in 1816. Eusceptis, Pseudalypia and Spragueia are sometimes included in the present genus, but here they are tentatively treated as different pending further research. Many species of Tarache were also once placed here (see below).

Description
Palpi long, porrect (extending forward) and met by a short sharp frontal tuft. Third joint prominent. Antennae simple. Thorax and abdomen smoothly scaled and tuftless. Forewings with non-crenulate cilia. Veins 7, 8 and 9, 10 stalked. Larva possess four abdominal prolegs.

Species

 Acontia albida (Hampson, 1910)
 Acontia albinigra Warren, 1913
 Acontia antecedens Walker, 1869
 Acontia antica Walker, 1862
 Acontia apatelia Swinhoe, 1907
 Acontia ardoris Hübner, [1827-1831]
 Acontia areletta Dyar, 1907
 Acontia asbenensis Rothschild, 1921
 Acontia basifera Walker, [1858]
 Acontia behrii Smith, 1900
 Acontia bicolora Leech, 1889
 Acontia bilimeki Felder & Rogenhofer, 1874
 Acontia biskrensis Oberthür, 1887
 Acontia brabanti Le Cerf, 1911
 Acontia briola Holland, 1894
 Acontia buchanani Rothschild, 1921
 Acontia caffraria Cramer, [1777]
 Acontia carnescens Hampson, 1910
 Acontia catenula Walker, 1865
 Acontia chea Druce, 1898 (syn: Acontia eudryada Smith, 1905)
 Acontia chia Holland, 1894
 Acontia chrysoproctis Hampson, 1902
 Acontia citripennis Hampson, 1910
 Acontia clerana Lower, 1902
 Acontia coquillettii Smith, 1900
 Acontia costistigma Walker, [1858]
 Acontia costosa Mabille, 1899
 Acontia crassivalva Wiltshire, 1947
 Acontia cratina Druce, 1889
 Acontia cretata Grote & Robinson, 1870 – chalky bird-dropping moth
 Acontia crocata Guenée, 1852
 Acontia cuprina Walker, [1863]
 Acontia cyanipha Lower, 1897
 Acontia cyanocraspi Hampson, 1910
 Acontia damia Druce, 1889
 Acontia decisa Walker, [1858]
 Acontia delphinensis Viette, 1968
 Acontia destricta Draudt, 1936
 Acontia detrita Butler, 1886
 Acontia dichroa Hampson, 1914
 Acontia discoidea Hopffer, 1858
 Acontia disrupta Warren, 1913
 Acontia elaeoa Hampson, 1910
 Acontia euschema Turner, 1920
 Acontia feae (Berio, 1937)
 Acontia fiebrigi Zerny, 1916
 Acontia flavonigra Swinhoe, 1884
 Acontia gagites Warren, 1913
 Acontia gloriosa (Kenrick, 1917)
 Acontia gradata Walker, [1858]
 Acontia gratiosa Wallengren, 1856
 Acontia guttifera Felder & Rogenhofer, 1874
 Acontia hemiglauca Hampson, 1910
 Acontia hemipentha Wiltshire, 1947
 Acontia hemixanthia Hampson, 1910
 Acontia hortensis Swinhoe, 1884
 Acontia imitatrix Wallengren, 1856
 Acontia interposita Dyar, 1912
 Acontia isolata Todd, 1960
 Acontia jaliscana Schaus, 1898
 Acontia leucotrigona Hampson, 1905
 Acontia lucida Hufnagel, 1766
 Acontia luteola Saalmüller, 1891
 Acontia malagasy Viette, 1965
 Acontia malgassica Mabille, 1881
 Acontia margaritana Drury, 1782
 Acontia marmoralis Fabricius, 1794
 Acontia mekki Rungs, 1953
 Acontia mesoleucoides Poole, 1989
 Acontia micrasti Lower, 1903
 Acontia micropis Druce, 1909
 Acontia microptera Mabille, 1879
 Acontia miegii Mabille, 1882
 Acontia miogona Hampson, 1916
 Acontia mizteca Schaus, 1898
 Acontia morides Schaus, 1894
 Acontia nephata Bethune-Baker, 1911
 Acontia neurota Lower, 1903
 Acontia niphogona Hampson, 1909
 Acontia nitidula Fabricius, 1787
 Acontia nivipicta Butler, 1886
 Acontia notabilis Walker, 1857
 Acontia nubifera (Hampson, 1910)
 Acontia nubilata Hampson, 1902
 Acontia ochrochroa Druce, 1909
 Acontia olivacea Hampson, 1891
 Acontia opalinoides Guenée, 1852
 Acontia parana E. D. Jones, 1921
 Acontia partita Walker, 1870
 Acontia pauliani Viette, 1965
 Acontia phaenna Druce, 1889
 Acontia phrygionis Hampson, 1910
 Acontia polychroma Walker, 1869
 Acontia porphyrea Butler, 1898
 Acontia psaliphora Hampson, 1910
 Acontia quadrata Walker, 1866
 Acontia rachiastis Hampson, 1908
 Acontia rufescens Hampson, 1910
 Acontia ruffinellii Biezanko, 1959
 Acontia ruficinta Hampson, 1910
 Acontia rufitincta Hampson, 1910
 Acontia secta Guenée, 1852
 Acontia seminigra Rebel, 1947
 Acontia sexpunctata Fabricius, 1794
 Acontia spangbergi Aurivillius, 1879
 Acontia sphaerophora Hampson, 1914
 Acontia stumpffi Saalmüller, 1891
 Acontia subarabica Wiltshire, 1982
 Acontia sublimbata Berio, 1984
 Acontia tetragonisa Hampson, 1910
 Acontia thapsina Turner, 1902
 Acontia tinctilis Wallengren, 1875
 Acontia titania Esper, 1798
 Acontia transfigurata Wallengren, 1856
 Acontia trimacula Saalmüller, 1891
 Acontia umbrigera Felder & Rogenhofer, 1874
 Acontia urania Frivaldszky, 1836
 Acontia vaualbum Hampson, 1914
 Acontia venita Schaus, 1904
 Acontia viridifera (Hampson, 1910)
 Acontia vittamargo Dyar, 1912
 Acontia wahlbergi Wallengren, 1856
 Acontia wallengreni Aurivillius, 1879
 Acontia yemenensis Hampson, 1918
 Acontia zelleri Wallengren, 1856

Former species transferred to Tarache
The following species were recently transferred to the genus Tarache:

 Acontia abdominalis Grote, 1877
 Acontia acerba (H. Edwards, 1881) (syn: Acontia acerboides Poole, 1989)
 Acontia albifusa Ferris & Lafontaine, 2009
 Acontia apela Druce, 1889
 Acontia aprica Hübner, [1808]
 Acontia areli Strecker, 1898
 Acontia areloides Barnes & McDunnough, 1912
 Acontia arida Smith, 1900
 Acontia assimilis Grote, 1875
 Acontia expolita Grote, 1882
 Acontia bella Barnes & Benjamin, 1922
 Acontia bilimeki (Felder & Rogenhofer, 1874) (syn: Acontia disconnecta Smith, 1903)
 Acontia cora Barnes & McDunnough, 1918
 Acontia dacia Druce, 1889
 Acontia delecta Walker, [1858]
 Acontia flavipennis Grote, 1873
 Acontia geminocula Ferris & Lafontaine, 2009
 Acontia knowltoni McDunnough, 1940
 Acontia lactipennis Harvey, 1875
 Acontia lagunae (Mustelin & Leuschner, 2000)
 Acontia lanceolata Grote, 1879
 Acontia lucasi Smith, 1900
 Acontia major Smith, 1900
 Acontia quadriplaga Smith, 1900
 Acontia sedata H. Edwards, 1881
 Acontia sutor Hampson, 1910
 Acontia tenuicula Morrison, 1875
 Acontia terminimaculata Grote, 1873
 Acontia tetragona Walker, [1858]
 Acontia toddi Ferris & Lafontaine, 2009

Former species
 Acontia discalis Walker, 1865

References

 
Acontiinae
Noctuoidea genera
Taxa named by Ferdinand Ochsenheimer